Raí Nascimento de Oliveira (born 18 May 1998), sometimes known simply as Raí, is a Brazilian footballer who plays as a forward for Ludogorets Razgrad.

Club career

Early career
Born in Rio de Janeiro, Raí Nascimento moved to Spain at the age of 14 and joined AD Stadium Casablanca's youth setup. In 2014, after representing Stadium Venecia, he moved to AD Alfindén in the regional leagues.

Raí made his senior debut on 21 December 2014, aged just 16, by starting in a 2–2 Primera Regional away draw against El Gancho CF. His first goal came on the following 18 January, the last in a 2–0 win at CD Perdiguera; he finished the season with eleven goals in just 15 appearances.

Zaragoza
In August 2016, Raí joined Real Zaragoza, but could not play until January due to the lack of international clearance. Initially assigned to the youth teams, he made his debut for the B-team on 8 January 2017 starting and scoring in a 2–4 Tercera División away loss against CD Belchite 97. He also scored in his second appearance late in the month, netting the fifth in a 5–0 home routing of AD Sabiñánigo.

Raí made his first team debut on 19 March 2017, coming on as a second-half substitute for Rolf Feltscher in a 1–2 home loss against Sevilla Atlético in the Segunda División. On 27 April he extended his contract until 2021, and was definitely promoted to the main squad on 6 June.

On 29 January 2019, Raí was loaned to Segunda División B side UD Ibiza until the end of the season. On 11 July, his loan was renewed for a further year.

After returning from loan, Raí was assigned to the main squad, and renewed his contract until 2023 on 28 September 2020. The following 25 January, however, he terminated his contract after appearing rarely.

Deportivo La Coruña
On 27 January 2021, Raí agreed to a short-term deal with Deportivo de La Coruña in the third division.

Bahia
On 23 September 2021, Raí returned to his home country after signing for Série A side Bahia until June 2022.

Ludogorets Razgrad
On 7 February 2023, Raí signed a contract with Ludogorets Razgrad.

Career statistics

Club

References

External links

1998 births
Living people
Footballers from Rio de Janeiro (city)
Brazilian footballers
Association football forwards
Campeonato Brasileiro Série A players
Campeonato Brasileiro Série B players
Segunda División players
Segunda División B players
Tercera División players
Divisiones Regionales de Fútbol players
Real Zaragoza B players
Real Zaragoza players
UD Ibiza players
Deportivo de La Coruña players
Esporte Clube Bahia players
Brazilian expatriate footballers
Brazilian expatriate sportspeople in Spain
Expatriate footballers in Spain